Ringside Seat is a 1983 video game published by Strategic Simulations.

Gameplay
Ringside Seat is a game in which the player manages a fighter in a strategic boxing simulation.

The game featured some real-life boxers, such as Sonny Liston and Rocky Marciano.

Reception
Dave Long reviewed the game for Computer Gaming World, and stated that "Even dedicated non-gamers will change their tune when you show them this one, with heads snapping back and bodies crashing to the canvas. Tie on your gloves and come out fighting, folks, because this game is for real!!"

Rick Teverbaugh reviewed the game for Computer Gaming World, and stated that "Overall, the game has just as believable results as anyone, but getting there just isn't quite as much fun.."

References

External links
Review in Softalk
1984 Software Encyclopedia from Electronic Games
Review in Compute!'s Gazette
Review in Electronic Games
Review in Commodore Power/Play

1983 video games
Apple II games
Boxing video games
Commodore 64 games
Strategic Simulations games
Video games developed in the United States